Karahal Khurd is a village in Kapurthala district of Punjab State, India. The village is administered by a Sarpanch, who is an elected representative.

Demography 
According to the report published by Census India in 2011, Karahal Khurd has 59 houses with the total population of 315 persons of which 158 are male and 157 females. Literacy rate of Karahal Khurd is 74.06%, lower than the state average of 75.84%.  The population of children in the age group 0–6 years is 49 which is 15.56% of the total population. Child sex ratio is approximately 1227, higher than the state average of 846.

Population data

References

External links
  Villages in Kapurthala
 Kapurthala Villages List

Villages in Kapurthala district